Tang Xiaodan (22 February 1910 – 21 January 2012) was a Chinese film director. In 1984, he won the Golden Rooster Award for Best Director. He was the father of painter Tang Muli and conductor Tang Muhai.

Filmography
This is a partial list of films.
 1933 A Movie Actress - Director
 1933 Bai Jinlong (白金龙) - Director
 1933 Drifting (飘零) - Director
 1936 The Perfect Match - Director
 1938 Shanghai under Fire (上海火线后) - Director
 1940 Little Guangdong - Director
 1941 Roar of the People (民族的吼声) - Director
 Dream in Paradise (天堂春梦; 1947)
 Reunion After Victory (胜利重逢; 1951)
 Victory After Victory (南征北战; 1952)
 Reconnaissance Across the Yangtze (渡江侦察记; 1954)
 City Without Nights (不夜城; 1957)
 Aolei Yilan (傲蕾·一兰; 1979)
 Nanchang Uprising (南昌起义; 1981)
 Liao Zhongkai (廖仲恺; 1983)

References

External links

 Tang Xiaodan at Hong Kong Cinemagic

1910 births
2012 deaths
Film directors from Fujian
Chinese centenarians
Chinese film directors
Chinese silent film directors
Hokkien people
Men centenarians
People from Zhangzhou